Schöneck (also: Schöneck/Vogtl.) is a town in the Vogtlandkreis district, in the Free State of Saxony, Germany. Schöneck is known as the biggest ski resort in the eastern part of Germany. With more than 700 m (church) it is the highest-located town in the Vogtland district. It is in the 'music corner', a region so-called because of its history of production of musical instruments.

Town structure 

The districts of Schöneck are Arnoldsgrün, Eschenbach, Gunzen, Korna, Kottenheide, Schilbach and Zwotental.

History 
Schöneck became a town in 1370, but was first mentioned a century before this, when the castle castrum Schoennecke was mentioned as a mediaeval manor.

After some devastating major fires (1632, 1680, 1761 and 1856), Schöneck took part in the industrialization of the 19th century. The town's main business became the cigar manufactory. In 1875, the railroad to Falkenstein and Klingenthal was built. The population grew significantly until World War II, but later the population contracted again.

Historical population 

Historical population growth and decline (from 1998, as of 31 December):

 Data source since 1998: the state office of statistics of Saxony

Personalities 

 Christian Gottlob Steinmüller (1792-1862), organ builder, born in Arnoldsgrün
 Kurt Demmler (1943-2009), songwriter and lyricist, completed an internship in the hospital in 1962/63
 Birgit Klaubert (born 1954), politician in (The Left), former vice president of the Thuringian parliament, since 2014 Minister of Education, Youth and Sports in Thuringia

References 

Vogtlandkreis